The painted chorus frog (Microhyla butleri), also commonly known as Butler's narrow-mouthed toad, Butler's pigmy frog, Butler's rice frog, Butler's ricefrog, noisy frog or tubercled pygmy frog, is a species of frog in the family Microhylidae. It is found in northeast India, Myanmar, southern China, Hong Kong, Taiwan, Thailand, Cambodia, Laos, Vietnam, Peninsular Malaysia, and Singapore.
Its natural habitats are subtropical or tropical moist lowland forest, subtropical or tropical moist montane forest, subtropical or tropical moist shrubland, swamps, intermittent freshwater marshes, arable land, plantations, rural gardens, ponds, open excavations, and irrigated land. It is not considered threatened by the IUCN.

Microhyla butleri have skin that is smooth or with small smooth warts above. They are brownish on their back, pale reddish on the sides and limbs, and whitish beneath.

Presence in Singapore
Microhyla Butleri had recently been added to the 'Bukit Timah Nature Reserve (BTNR) checklist to be updated to 115 species in 2019.

Gallery

References

External links
Amphibian and Reptiles of Peninsular Malaysia - Microhyla butleri

Microhyla
Amphibians of Myanmar
Amphibians of Cambodia
Amphibians of China
Fauna of Hong Kong
Frogs of India
Amphibians of Laos
Amphibians of Malaysia
Amphibians of Singapore
Amphibians of Taiwan
Amphibians of Thailand
Amphibians of Vietnam
Amphibians described in 1900
Taxonomy articles created by Polbot